Cervantesia is a genus of plants in the family Santalaceae.  It contains 5 species distributed from Colombia to Bolivia.

External links
Arboles y Arbustos de los Andes del Ecuador (Cervantesia)

Santalaceae
Santalales genera
Flora of South America